Malcolm Gurney Salter (10 May 1887 – 15 June 1973) was an English cricketer. He played for Gloucestershire between 1907 and 1927.

References

External links

1887 births
1973 deaths
English cricketers
Gloucestershire cricketers
Sportspeople from Cheltenham
Oxford and Cambridge Universities cricketers
Oxford University cricketers
People educated at Cheltenham College
Alumni of Hertford College, Oxford
Europeans cricketers